Roy Finlayson (31 March 1909 – 19 July 1997) was an Australian rules footballer who played with Fitzroy in the Victorian Football League (VFL).

Notes

External links 
		

1909 births
1997 deaths
Australian rules footballers from Victoria (Australia)
Fitzroy Football Club players
Castlemaine Football Club players